Intense Tropical Cyclone Jokwe was the first tropical cyclone to make landfall in Mozambique since Cyclone Favio struck in the previous year, and was the most recent cyclone to make landfall on Mozambique until Cyclone Dineo in 2017. The tenth named storm of the 2007–08 South-West Indian Ocean cyclone season, Jokwe was first classified as a tropical depression on March 2 over the open Southwest Indian Ocean. It tracked west-southwest, crossing northern Madagascar as a tropical storm on March 5 before intensifying into a tropical cyclone on March 6. It quickly weakened while paralleling the coastline, though the storm restrengthened as it turned southward in the Mozambique Channel. Late in its duration, it remained nearly stationary for several days, and steadily weakened due to wind shear before dissipating on March 16.

The storm caused minor damage in northern Madagascar. In Mozambique, the cyclone affected 200,000 people, and left at least sixteen fatalities. Cyclone Jokwe destroyed over 9,000 houses and damaged over 3,000 more, with the heaviest damage in Angoche and the Island of Mozambique in Nampula Province. The storm also caused widespread power outages and crop damages. The name Jokwe was submitted to the World Meteorological Organization by Botswana.

Meteorological history

The disturbance tracked west-southwestward, and on March 2 the Météo-France (MFR) declared it as a weak depression. Initially in an area of moderate wind shear, the system at first failed to maintain deep convection. Initially the MFR forecast that the depression would intensify further before striking Madagascar.

The cyclone tracked generally westward along the northern periphery of a ridge. The circulation became better defined, though convection was displaced to the west of the center due to persistent wind shear. Intensification was favored, though, due to warm water temperatures and good outflow. Early on March 5, the Joint Typhoon Warning Center  (JTWC) classified the system as Tropical Cyclone 22S. At first, the storm was smaller than usual, with gale-force winds extending  from the center. Jokwe turned to the west-southwest in response to the development of a trough of low pressure in the Mozambique Channel, and late on March 5 the storm crossed over northern Madagascar. The low-level circulation became disorganized due to land interaction, though its mid and upper-level circulation remained well-organized. Subsequently, the storm encountered more favorable conditions, and an eye developed; Jokwe underwent rapid deepening and intensified to tropical cyclone status, or the equivalence of a minimal hurricane, midday on March 6 off the northwest coast of Madagascar.

Shortly after attaining tropical cyclone status, Jokwe began weakening as its eye disappeared, and it weakened to tropical storm status. The weakening trend was short-lived, and after turning westward the storm re-developed a  eye. Jokwe again underwent rapid intensification as it approached the coast of Mozambique, becoming an intense "midget cyclone" with winds of  late on March 7; the MFR explained its rapid intensity changes due to its small size. Excellent upper-level outflow and warm waters contributed to the intensification. It weakened slightly while paralleling the coastline just offshore, and at 1015 UTC Jokwe made landfall between the Island of Mozambique and Angoche.

Cyclone Jokwe remained over land for about 18 hours before emerging into the Mozambique Channel, weakening quickly to tropical storm status. Upon reaching open waters, convection increased over the center, and late on March 9 Jokwe re-intensified to a tropical cyclone as an eye reappeared on satellite imagery. The cyclone turned to the south-southeast, around the periphery of a ridge to its east. An upper-level low to its south produced good outflow which, in combination with warm waters, allowed Jokwe to re-intensify. Subsequently, an increase in wind shear caused a steady weakening trend, and by March 12 Jokwe weakened to tropical storm status as its center became partially exposed from the deep convection; at the same time, the storm turned to the southwest.

Later on March 12, thunderstorms reformed over the center, as its movement became nearly stationary due to a ridge to its south and northwest. Early on March 13, it began a steady movement to the northwest, and its organization increased with an eye re-appearing; after briefly re-attaining tropical cyclone status, Jokwe again weakened to tropical storm status due to persistent wind shear. Convection continued to diminish, and on March 14 Jokwe weakened to tropical depression status as the center became almost fully exposed. Early on March 15, the MFR issued its last advisory on the system. The remnants accelerated southeastward and dissipated on March 16 to the southwest of Madagascar.

Impact

Crossing northern Madagascar as a tropical storm, Jokwe damaged or destroyed 44 buildings in Nosy Be, leaving 400 homeless.

On March 7, the National Emergency Operational Centre of Mozambique warned for coastal residents in Nampula and Zambezia provinces to be on alert. A day later, the agency issued a Red Alert for northern Nampula Province, advising potentially affected residents to seek shelter. Subsequently, the alert was extended southwestward along the coastline. Strong winds and heavy rains from the storm left the island of Mozambique without power, as well as water. There winds knocked down several poorly constructed houses, and also destroyed the roofs of two schools. Across Nampula Province, heavy agricultural damage was reported; a total of 508 animals on farms were killed, and about 2 million cashew trees were destroyed. Widespread power outages were reported, with 75% of power transmission lines damaged or destroyed. The cyclone destroyed at least 200 boats and the roofs of at least 80 schools. The storm destroyed a bridge across the Mogincual River, which left the town of Namige isolated. Across Nampula Province, Jokwe destroyed 9,316 houses and damaged 3,220 more, most of which in Angoche. In Pebane District in neighboring Zambezia Province, the cyclone destroyed nine houses. Rainfall was reported throughout the province, though damage was not as heavy due to lack of strong winds. Throughout Mozambique, the cyclone affected 200,000 people, with a total of 55,000 people left homeless. Ten people were killed in Nampula Province, and six more were killed in coastal districts of Zambezia Province.

On March 10, a station on Europa Island in the Mozambique Channel reported a pressure of 985.5 mbar.

Aftermath

Shortly after the cyclone moved ashore along Mozambique, officials distributed tents and food to the affected citizens. The government activated the National Civil Protection Unit to clear fallen trees from roadways, as well as assist in rebuilding damaged or destroyed homes. A few days after the storm, the Mozambique Red Cross began delivering mosquito nets, blankets, plastic buckets, and sleeping mats.  The government of Nampula estimated it would require $8 million (USD) to repair storm damage in the province.

Two weeks after the storm, the World Food Programme announced it would provide food for 60,000 people in the impacted areas of Mozambique. On March 27, the government of Portugal donated $700,000 (USD) to the Mozambique National Disasters Management Institute; over half of the total was aid for flood victims affected by Jokwe and flooding earlier in the year.

See also

List of tropical cyclones
Timeline of the 2007–08 South-West Indian Ocean cyclone season

References

External links
La Réunion - Météo-France Report on Cyclone Jokwe (French)

Jokwe (2008)
Jokwe (2008)
Jokwe (2008)
2008 in Madagascar
Jokwe (2008)
Jokwe